Miss World Ecuador 2014, was the 2nd edition of the Miss World Ecuador held on October 4, 2014, where Laritza Párraga from Santo Domingo crowned Virginia Limongi from Manabí as the new representative to Miss World 2014.

Results

Placements

Special awards

Judges

 Patty Salame - Cosas Magazine Director
 Ramiro Finol - Businessman
 Juan Manuel Koing - Koing & Partners
 Arnaldo Lucas Correa - People en Español Etidor
 Roxana Queirolo -  Fashion designer
 Maritza Massuh - Jewelry designer
 Carlos Coello - TC TV Manager
 Cecilia Niemes - Former model
 Raúl del Sol - Artist

Official Contestants

Notes

Debuts

  Azuay
  Cotopaxi

Withdraws

  Bolívar
  Cañar
  El Oro
  Imbabura
  Santo Domingo
 Tungurahua

Crossovers
Ana Elisa Arteaga was the 1st Runner-up (Virreina) at Reina de Cuenca 2009 and Miss Pacífico Ecuador 2012.
Gianina Bayona competed at Miss Atlántico Internacional 2014.
Virginia Limongi was Reina de Portoviejo 2012 and Reina de Manabí 2012.
Estefanía Realpe competed at Miss Ecuador 2012 but she was unplaced. She was selected as Miss Earth Ecuador 2013 but she was dethroned a few days before to compete at Miss Earth 2013.
Karem Varas won Reina Mundial del Banano Capítulo Ecuador 2016
Virginia Limongi competed in Top Model Of The World 2016, she made the Top 15.
Karem Varas competed in Reina Mundial del Banano 2016, she was 3rd runner-up.

References

Beauty pageants in Ecuador
2014